Ruth Crawford Seeger (born Ruth Porter Crawford; July 3, 1901 – November 18, 1953) was an American composer and folk music specialist. Her music was a prominent exponent of the emerging modernist aesthetic and she became a central member of a group of American composers known as the "ultramoderns". Though she composed primarily during the 1920s and 1930s, Seeger turned towards studies on folk music from the late 1930s until her death. Her music influenced later composers, particularly Elliott Carter.

Childhood
Ruth Crawford was born in East Liverpool, Ohio, the second child of Clark Crawford, a Methodist minister, and Clara Crawford (née Graves). The family moved several times during Crawford's childhood, living in Akron, Ohio, St. Louis, Missouri, and Muncie, Indiana. In 1912, the family moved to Jacksonville, Florida, where Clark Crawford died of tuberculosis two years later. After her husband's death, Clara Crawford opened a boarding house and struggled to maintain her family's middle-class lifestyle.

Ruth began writing poetry at an early age and as a teenager had aspirations to become an "authoress or poetess". She also studied the piano beginning at age six. In 1913, she began piano lessons with Bertha Foster, who had founded the School of Musical Art in Jacksonville in 1908. In 1917, Ruth began to study with Madame Valborg Collett, who was a student of Agathe Backer Grøndahl and the most prestigious teacher at Foster's School of Musical Art. After her graduation from high school in 1918, Crawford began to pursue a career as a concert pianist, continuing her studies with Collett and performing at various musical events in Jacksonville. She also became a piano teacher at Foster's school and wrote her first compositions for her young pupils in 1918 and 1919.

Career

Chicago

Crawford moved to Chicago in 1921 where she enrolled at the American Conservatory of Music, initially planning to stay for a single year, long enough to earn a teaching certificate. In Chicago, she attended symphony and opera performances for the first time as well as recitals by eminent pianists including Sergei Rachmaninoff and Arthur Rubinstein. At the Conservatory, she studied piano with Heniot Levy and Louise Robyn. Crawford's focus at the Conservatory quickly shifted from piano performance to composition. During her second year there, she began composition and theory studies with Adolf Weidig and wrote several early works, including a Nocturne for Violin and Piano (1923) and a set of theme and variations for piano (1923). Clara Crawford moved to Chicago to live with her daughter in 1923. The next year, Ruth received her bachelor's degree in music from the Conservatory and subsequently enrolled in the school's master's degree program.

While Crawford continued to study theory and composition with Weidig at the American Conservatory of Music through 1929, in 1924 she also began private piano lessons with Djane Lavoie-Herz. Herz, one of the most prestigious piano teachers in Chicago at the time, had a profound impact on Crawford's intellectual and musical life. Herz sparked Crawford's interest in theosophy and the music of Alexander Scriabin, and introduced her pupil to an influential community of artists and thinkers. Through Herz, Crawford met Dane Rudhyar and Henry Cowell, composers who would both have a significant impact on Crawford's music and career. During this time, Crawford also met the leading Chicago poet Carl Sandburg, whose writings she eventually set to music.

New York

Crawford spent the summer of 1929 at the MacDowell Colony on a scholarship, where she began a friendship with fellow composer Marion Bauer and began work on her Five Songs set to poems by Sandburg. In the fall of that year, Crawford moved into the New York home of music patron Blanche Walton and began studying composition with Charles Seeger.

In 1930, she became the first female composer to receive the Guggenheim Fellowship and went to Berlin and Paris. She inquired about a renewal of her fellowship several times over the course of the next year, but was ultimately refused a renewal. During that time, she interviewed Emil Hertzka to discuss publishing her music, but he said "it would be particularly hard for a woman to get anything published." Crawford subsequently travelled to Vienna and Budapest to meet composers Alban Berg and Béla Bartók to discuss her music and gain support for publication. Though surrounded by exponents of German modernism, she chose to study and compose alone. Seeger's ideas, communicated by letter, were crucial to the development of her style and selections. She and Charles Seeger married in 1932 after her subsequent trip to Paris. At the International Society for Contemporary Music Festival in Amsterdam (1933), her Three Songs for voice, oboe, percussion and strings represented the United States.

Washington D.C.
Crawford Seeger and her family moved to Washington, D.C., in 1936 after Charles' appointment to the music division of the Resettlement Administration. There Crawford Seeger worked closely with John and Alan Lomax at the Archive of American Folk Song at the Library of Congress to preserve and teach American folk music. Her arrangements and interpretations of American traditional folk songs are among the most respected. These include transcriptions for American Folk Songs for Children, Animal Folk Songs for Children (1950), American Folk Songs for Christmas (1953), Our Singing Country, and Folk Song USA by John and Alan Lomax. However, she is best known for Our Singing Country (1941). She also composed "Rissolty, Rossolty" – An American Fantasy for Orchestra based on folk tunes, for the CBS radio series The American School of the Air.

She returned to her modernist roots in early 1952 with Suite for Wind Quintet, but in 1953 she died from intestinal cancer, in Chevy Chase, Maryland.  She was buried at the Springfield Cemetery in Springfield, Massachusetts.

Family

In 1932, she married Charles Seeger. Their children, including Mike Seeger, Peggy Seeger, Barbara, Penny, and older stepson Pete Seeger, knew their mother as "Dio". Several of the children as musical artists themselves became central to the American folk revival, but they had little knowledge of their mother's former life as a beacon of American ultramodernism.

Composition

The compositions that Crawford Seeger wrote in Chicago from 1924 to 1929 reflect the influence of Alexander Scriabin, Dane Rudhyar, and her piano teacher Djane Lavoie-Herz. Judith Tick calls these years Crawford Seeger's "first distinctive style period" and writes that the composer's music during this time "might be termed 'post-tonal pluralism' ". Her compositions from this first style period, including Five Preludes for Piano, Sonata for Violin and Piano, Suite No. 2 for Strings and Piano, and Five Songs on Sandburg Poems (1929), are marked by strident dissonance, irregular rhythms, and evocations of spirituality.

Crawford Seeger's reputation as a composer rests chiefly on her New York compositions written between 1930 and 1933, which exploit dissonant counterpoint and American serial techniques. During these years Crawford began to incorporate polytonality and tone clusters into her compositions. She was one of the first composers to extend serial processes to musical elements other than pitch and to develop formal plans based on serial operations. Her technique may have been influenced by the music of Schoenberg, although they met only briefly during her studies in Germany. Many of her works from this period employ dissonant counterpoint, a theoretical compositional system developed by Charles Seeger and used by Henry Cowell, Johanna Beyer, and others. Seeger outlined his methodology for dissonant counterpoint in his treatise, Tradition and Experiment in (the New) Music, which he wrote with the input and assistance of Crawford during the summer of 1930. Crawford Seeger's contribution to the book was significant enough that the possibility of co-authorship was briefly raised.

String Quartet 1931, particularly the third movement, is Crawford Seeger's most famous and influential work. The composer described the "underlying plan" of the third movement as "a heterophony of dynamics—a sort of counterpoint of crescendi and diminuendi. ... The melodic line grows out of this continuous increase and decrease; it is given, one tone at a time, to different instruments, and each new melodic tone is brought in at the high point in a crescendo". The dynamic slides create the lengthy melody that spans the entire movement and shape the narrative arc.

Works

Early
Little Waltz, for piano, 1922
Piano Sonata, 1923
Theme and Variations, for piano, 1923
Little Lullaby, for piano, 1923
Jumping the Rope (Playtime), for piano, 1923
Caprice, for piano, 1923
Whirligig, for piano, 1923
Mr Crow and Miss Wren Go for a Walk (A Little Study in Short Trills), for piano, 1923
Kaleidoscopic Changes on an Original Theme, Ending with a Fugue, for piano, 1924
Five Canons, for piano, 1924
Piano Preludes No. 1–5, 1924–25
Adventures of Tom Thumb, 1925
Sonata for Violin and Piano, 1926
Two Movements for Chamber Orchestra (Music for Small Orchestra), 1926
We Dance Together, for piano, 1926
Piano Preludes No. 6–9, 1927–28 (corrected version)
Suite No.1, for five wind instruments and piano, 1927, rev. 1929
Suite No. 2, for four strings and piano, 1929
Five Songs to Poems by Carl Sandburg: Home Thoughts, White Moon, Joy, Loam, Sunsets, 1929

Middle
Piano Study in Mixed Accents (three versions), 1930
Four Diaphonic Suites: No.1 for oboe or flute, No.2 for bassoon and cello (or two cellos), No.3 for two clarinets, No.4 for oboe (or viola) and cello, 1930
Three Chants for Female Chorus: To an Unkind God, To an Angel, To a Kind God, 1930
Three Songs to poems by Carl Sandburg, for contralto, piano, oboe, percussion and optional orchestra: Rat Riddles, Prayers of Steel, In Tall Grass, 1930–1932
String Quartet, 1931
Andante for Strings (after String Quartet Slow Movement), 1931 ?
Two Ricercare to poems by Hsi Tseng Tsiang: Sacco, Vanzetti; "Chinaman, Laundryman", 1932
The Love at the Harp, 1932

Late
Nineteen American Folk Songs for Piano, 1936–1938
Rissolty, Rossolty, 1939–1941
American Folk Songs for Children, 1948
Animal Folk Songs for Children, 1950
Suite for Wind Quintet, 1952
American Folk Songs for Christmas, 1953

Unknown date
 Songs: Those Gambler's Blues, Lonesome Road, Lord Thomas, Sweet Betsy From Pike, Go to Sleep, What'll We Do with the Baby?, Three Ravens, A Squirrel is a Pretty Thing, Who Built the Ark?, Every Monday Morning, I Wish I Was Single

Notes and references
Notes

References

Sources

Further reading

 Allen, Ray, and Ellie M. Hisama, eds. (2007). Ruth Crawford Seeger's Worlds: Innovation and Tradition in Twentieth-Century American Music. Rochester: University of Rochester Press.
 de Graaf, Melissa (2008). " 'Never Call Us Lady Composers': Gendered Receptions in the New York Composers' Forum, 1935–1940". American Music 26, no. 3 (Fall): 277–308.
 Gaume, Matilda (1986). Ruth Crawford Seeger: Memoirs, Memories, Music. [[Composers of North America, no. 3. Metuchen, New Jersey: Scarecrow Press.
 Straus, Joseph N. (1995) The Music of Ruth Crawford Seeger. Cambridge University Press.
 Tick, Judith (1999). "Ruth Crawford Seeger: A Composer's Search for American Music". Ethnomusicology 43, no. 1 (Winter): 171–174.
 Tick, Judith, and Wayne Schneider, eds. (1993). Music for Small Orchestra (1926); Suite No. 2 for Four Strings and Piano (1929). In Music of the United States of America (MUSA) vol. 1, Madison, Wisconsin: A-R Editions. 
 Vogel, Scott. (January 30, 2001). "Composer Chose 'Life' over Work: Ruth Crawford-Seeger Never Revived Her Promising Musical Career". Honolulu Star-Bulletin.

External links

Ruth Crawford Seeger Biography in 600 words by David Lewis with a note by Peggy Seeger
"Ruth Crawford Seeger's Contributions to Musical Modernism" by Joseph N. Straus, Fall 2001, vol. XXXI, No. 1, Newsletter, Institute for Studies in American Music (ISAM)
Art of the States: Ruth Crawford Seeger Nine Preludes'' (1924–1928)
 
 

1901 births
1953 deaths
20th-century American women musicians
20th-century American composers
20th-century classical composers
20th-century women composers
American avant-garde musicians
American classical composers
American Conservatory of Music alumni
American contemporary classical composers
American experimental musicians
American music educators
American people of English descent
American women classical composers
Classical musicians from Ohio
Composers for piano
Deaths from colorectal cancer
Deaths from cancer in Maryland
Educators from Ohio
Experimental composers
Modernist composers
People from East Liverpool, Ohio
Pupils of Charles Seeger
Pupils of Henry Cowell
Seeger family
String quartet composers
Twelve-tone and serial composers